Satanic Blood is the full-length debut album by American black metal band Von. It was released on October 31, 2012 via the band's own label, Von Records.

It is the band's first release since their hiatus in 1992 and subsequent reunion in 2010. The album mostly contains the reworked versions of songs in the band's 1992 demo, Satanic Blood. It does not feature the band's original vocalist and guitarist, Goat, who left the band just after the reunion.

Critical reception

The album met with mixed to positive reviews. Sammy O'Hagar of MetalSucks gave the album a positive review and praised its raw sound and production. He also compared the album's sound to other notable second wave of black metal albums such as Transilvanian Hunger by Darkthrone and De Mysteriis Dom Sathanas by Mayhem. He also described the album's tempo as "mid-paced", in contrast to other black metal acts such as Satyricon, 1349 and Anaal Nathrakh. Venien's vocals were also likened to those of death metal, while the "rattling" guitar sound and noticeable basslines were noted. However, the reaction of Grayson Currin of Pitchfork Media was mixed. He criticized the album's lack of progression and Venien's "bastardization" of Von's legacy although he also complimented on the album's low-fidelity production, high-energy and enthusiasm. Death metal, grindcore and hardcore punk elements in the album were also noted.

Track listing

Personnel

Von
 Venien (Jason Ventura) – vocals, bass, composition, production, engineering
 JGiblete Cuervo (Lord Giblete) – guitar, backing vocals, engineering

Additional musicians
 Charlie Fell – drums
 Shawn Calizo (Goat) – composition

Other personnel
 Andrew Ragin – mixing, engineering
 John Gray – mastering
 Frank Caruso – engineering

References

External links
 

2012 debut albums
Von (band) albums
Self-released albums